The Karachi women's cricket team is the women's representative cricket team for Karachi. They competed in the National Women's Cricket Championship between 2004–05 and 2017, winning the competition four times.

History
Karachi joined the National Women's Cricket Championship for its inaugural season in 2004–05, and competed in it in every subsequent season until it ended in 2017. The side won the competition four times: firstly, in its inaugural season, Karachi topped the initial group stage and the subsequent Final Stage, before beating Lahore in the final to win the tournament. After losing the 2005–06 final to Lahore, they then won the tournament two seasons in a row, in 2006–07 and 2007–08, both times beating Lahore in the final.

Karachi lost in the final of the competition again in 2009–10 and 2014, before finally winning their fourth title in the final season of the National Women's Cricket Championship, 2017, topping the Super League section of the tournament with three wins and one abandonment from their four matches.

Players

Notable players
Players who played for Karachi and played internationally are listed below, in order of first international appearance (given in brackets):

 Kiran Baluch (1997)
 Shaiza Khan (1997)
 Khursheed Jabeen (2000)
 Batool Fatima (2001)
 Urooj Mumtaz (2004)
 Armaan Khan (2005)
 Sana Mir (2005)
 Humera Masroor (2006)
 Nain Abidi (2006)
 Javeria Khan (2008)
 Sania Khan (2009)
 Rabiya Shah (2010)
 Kanwal Naz (2010)
 Shumaila Qureshi (2010)
 Kainat Imtiaz (2010)
 Masooma Junaid (2011)
 Javeria Rauf (2012)
 Maham Tariq (2014)
 Ayesha Zafar (2015)
 Muneeba Ali (2016)
 Aiman Anwer (2016)
 Omaima Sohail (2018)
 Fatima Sana (2019)
 Rameen Shamim (2019)
 Syeda Aroob Shah (2019)

Seasons

National Women's Cricket Championship

Honours
 National Women's Cricket Championship:
 Winners (4): 2004–05, 2006–07, 2007–08 & 2017

See also
 List of Karachi first-class cricket teams

References

Women's cricket teams in Pakistan
Cricket in Karachi